Breaking All the Rules is a 1985 American-Canadian comedy film directed by James Orr.

Plot
Jack spends his summer doing a part-time job in an amusement park. Meanwhile, an expensive diamond is stolen by three thieves. In order to escape from the police, the thieves hide the diamond inside a fluffy toy at the park. However, Jack's fingerprints were left at the crime scene unintentionally.

It is the last day of summer vacation, so Jack decides to hangout with his best friend David. On their way to the park, they meet two cute girls: Debbie and Angie. The four have a good time in the park, and Jack and David both fall in love with the girls, but they don't know that the three thieves have come back to the park and plan to take their diamond back.

Cast

References

External links

Canadian comedy films
English-language Canadian films
1985 films
American comedy films
1985 comedy films
Films scored by Paul Zaza
1985 directorial debut films
Films directed by James Orr (filmmaker)
1980s English-language films
Films set in amusement parks
1980s American films
1980s Canadian films